William Garson Paszamant (February 20, 1964September 21, 2021) was an American actor. He appeared in over 75 films and more than 300 TV episodes. He was known for playing Stanford Blatch on the HBO series Sex and the City, in the related films Sex and the City and Sex and the City 2 and in the spin-off And Just Like That..., Mozzie in the USA Network series White Collar from 2009 to 2014, Ralph in the 2005 romantic comedy Little Manhattan, Gerard Hirsch in the reboot of Hawaii Five-0, and Martin Lloyd in the sci-fi series Stargate SG-1.

Early life and education
Garson was born in Highland Park, New Jersey, the son of Muriel (née Schwartz) and Donald M. Paszamant. Garson was Jewish. He attended Camp Wekeela in Hartford, Maine, as a child for 11 years.

He graduated in 1982 from Highland Park High School. In 1985, he received a Bachelor of Fine Arts degree in Theater from Wesleyan University and a Master of Fine Arts degree from the Yale Drama School.

Career

Television
Garson had a recurring role as Henry Coffield on NYPD Blue and as Stanford Blatch on Sex and the City. His other television appearances include Mr. Belvedere, My Two Dads, Coach ("The Loss Weekend" episode as a clerk), Quantum Leap (once as a newspaper salesman/hack writer, and once as Lee Harvey Oswald), Twin Peaks, Monk, Boy Meets World, Girl Meets World (playing four different characters in the latter two shows' universe), Ally McBeal, Party of Five, Star Trek: Voyager (in the episode "Thirty Days"), Special Unit 2, Just Shoot Me!, Ask Harriet, Buffy the Vampire Slayer, Friends (as Ross Geller's neighbor in the episode "The One With the Girl Who Hits Joey"), The X-Files (twice and as two different characters), Cheers (as a waiter in the episode "Cape Cad"), Yes, Dear, CSI: Crime Scene Investigation, Pushing Daisies, Stargate SG-1 (3 episodes), Wizards of Waverly Place, CSI: Miami, Mental, Spin City, and Taken.  He co-starred in the 2007 HBO series John from Cincinnati.  He co-starred as Mozzie in the USA Network series White Collar from 2009 to 2014. From 2019 to 2020, he was a regular guest star on the syndicated game show 25 Words or Less.

Film
Garson also appeared in three movies from the Farrelly brothers – Kingpin, There's Something About Mary, and Fever Pitch.  His other film credits include Groundhog Day, Just Like Heaven, The Rock, Fortress 2: Re-Entry, Being John Malkovich, Freaky Friday, Labor Pains, and Out Cold.  He made a cameo in the end credits of Jackass Number Two, with the full context of the cameo being explained in Jackass 2.5. He also appears in Before I Go (2021).

Personal life
Garson adopted a seven-year-old boy, Nathen, in 2009.

Though he is mainly known for having played an openly gay man on Sex and the City, he was heterosexual. He avoided discussing his sexual orientation publicly:

Death
Garson died from pancreatic cancer at his home in Los Angeles, California on September 21, 2021 at age 57.

Filmography

Film

Television

References

External links

 

1964 births
2021 deaths
20th-century American male actors
21st-century American male actors
American male film actors
American male television actors
Deaths from cancer in California
Deaths from pancreatic cancer
Highland Park High School (New Jersey) alumni
Jewish American male actors
Male actors from New Jersey
People from Highland Park, New Jersey
Wesleyan University alumni
Yale School of Drama alumni
21st-century American Jews